A potted meat food product is a food preserved by canning and consisting of various seasoned cooked meats,  often puréed, minced, or ground, which is heat-processed and sealed into small cans. This is different from potted meat, an older noncommercial method of preserving meat.

Various meats, such as beef, pork, chicken, and turkey are used. It is produced primarily as a source of affordable meat. Its precooked state and long shelf life make it suitable for emergency food supplies, camping and military uses. Potted meat food product contains high amounts of fat, salt and  preservatives which may make it unhealthy for regular consumption. It typically has a spreadable texture, similar to pâté, and is usually eaten in sandwiches or spread on crackers.

Reputation 
Canned potted meats have a mixed reputation for their taste, texture, ingredients, preparation and nutrition. The canning process produces a product with a generally homogeneous texture and flavor. It utilizes low-cost ingredients such as mechanically separated chicken or turkey, which is disdained in some communities.

Ingredients
 Armour Star: Mechanically separated chicken, pork, water, salt, and less than 2%: mustard, natural flavor, garlic powder, vinegar, dextrose, sodium erythorbate, and sodium nitrite.
 Hormel: Beef tripe, mechanically separated chicken, beef hearts, partially defatted cooked beef fatty tissue, meat broth, vinegar, garlic powder, onion powder, salt, flavoring, sugar, and sodium nitrite.
Libby's (discontinued): Mechanically separated chicken, pork skin, partially defatted cooked pork fatty tissue, partially defatted cooked beef fatty tissue, vinegar, less than 2% of: salt, spices, sugar, flavorings, sodium erythorbate and sodium nitrite.

See also

 Food preservation
 Potted shrimps
 Spam (food)
 Bully beef
 Tushonka
 Pâté

References

Canned meat
Food products
Food paste